Peter Filbert (1793 – May 28, 1864) was the first mayor of the city of Reading, Pennsylvania.

He was born in Reading in 1793. He was the son of Peter Filbert, who was Sheriff of Berks County from 1785 to 1787. Filbert was a lawyer, being admitted to practice at Reading, January 6, 1831. In 1840 he represented Berks County in the State Legislature. He filled the position of Chief Burgess of Reading for several years until its incorporation as a city in 1847, when he was elected Mayor, holding this post for one year. While serving as Mayor he was appointed District Deputy Attorney General for Berks County. He died May 28, 1864, at the age of 71.

References

1793 births
1864 deaths
Mayors of Reading, Pennsylvania
19th-century American politicians